Helena Bulaja (born 6 December 1971) is a Croatian multimedia artist, film director, scriptwriter, designer and film producer.

Biography
Helena Bulaja was born in Split, Croatia. She was educated in art history and comparative literature at the Faculty of Philosophy in Zagreb. She lives in Zagreb.

Career
Bulaja has been active in digital art, design, art and film since 1994. In the early days of her career she worked as art director, designer and illustrator for several Croatian computer magazines (Computerworld Croatia, Net, Vidi), and in 1995 she started her digital artist career. In the 1990s, her interactive art projects, mostly concerned with metaphors, tele-presence and the relation of the real world to cyberspace, were featured in magazines such as Hotwired, and presented at Ars Electronica arts and technology festival's Net Art selection in Linz, Austria in 1997.

In 2000, Bulaja started an animated and interactive adaptation of fairytales from the book Priče iz davnine (Croatian Tales of Long Ago) written by Ivana Brlić-Mažuranić, a Croatian writer for children ("the Slavic Tolkien"), and based on Slavic mythology. Bulaja was the originator, editor-in-chief, manager, director and designer of the project. The project was presented at more than 30 international conferences and festivals dedicated to interactive media, animation and film, and won several awards, including the story category at the FlashForward Festival 2002 in San Francisco, the best multimedia award at Lucca Comics and Games in 2004, at the International Family Film Festival in 2007 in Hollywood, and the Zagreb City Award. The interactive animated project Croatian Tales of Long Ago explored the relationship between digital media and classical literature and was created by eight independent teams of authors from around the world (including Australia, Germany, France, USA, Canada, England, and Scotland) whose work was coordinated on the Internet. Contributors to the project included Nathan Jurevicius, Christian Biegai, Alistair Keddie, Laurence Arcadias, Ellen McAuslan, Mirek and Paulina Nisenbaum, Sabina Hahn, Edgar Beals, Katrin Rothe, Brenda Hutchinson, Leon Lučev, Sabina Hahn, and Erik Adigard. Each of the eight teams transferred one of the eight fairy tales from Brlić's original book to digital media, with complete artistic and creative freedom.

Since 2006, Bulaja has been developing the experimental interactive documentary Mechanical Figures with an international team of authors. The project was inspired by the Serbian-American scientist and inventor Nikola Tesla. The film will be released in different media: as a linear theatric and TV documentary, a series of short films, as well as an interactive film for the Web and mobile devices such as iPhone and iPad. In the film, stories and thoughts about Tesla and creativity are told by some of the most intriguing and inspiring artists, thinkers, writers and scientists, like the film director Terry Gilliam, musician and artist Laurie Anderson, performance artist Marina Abramović, writer Christopher Priest, new media theorist Douglas Rushkoff, actor Andy Serkis, and Kyoto University president Hiroshi Matsumoto. The project is also questioning film as an art form in the time of technological development and the new media, and it leads the viewer through the process of creation, following Tesla's legacy around the world from Zagreb through London, Paris, Budapest, New York City, to Tokyo and New Zealand. The project won MEDIA support for development, as first Croatian documentary film project.

Bulaja is also developing an animated project for TV and interactive media, The Cat Time Stories, which also won MEDIA development support as first Croatian animation project, based on short stories about cats and people written by Croatian writer Nada Horvat. The project was selected and presented at Cartoon Forum in September 2010 in Sopron, Hungary.

References

External links 
 Personal website
 Helena Bulaja Madunić TEDx Talk about Nikola Tesla
 Teslopolis Innovation Center
 Nikola Tesla - Mind from the Future Exhibition by Helena Bulaja Madunić
 Digital Catalogue of the Exhibition "Nikola Tesla Mind from The Future"
 Mechanical Figures Inspired by Tesla - Helena Bulaja Madunić's creative documentary and cross-media project
 Croatian Tales of Long Ago - The most awarded Croatian animated film collection 
 NIkola Tesla-Mind form the Future" interview by Helena Bulaja Madunić
 Founding of Niagara Tesla Innovation Centre Marked by Croatian Tie
 Interview with Helena Bulaja: Tesla had Internet in his head!, at www.body-pixel.com

1971 births
Croatian animators
Croatian animated film directors
Croatian film directors
Croatian women film directors
Croatian video artists
Multimedia artists
Women animators
Women multimedia artists
21st-century Croatian artists
Artists from Split, Croatia
Living people
21st-century women artists
Film people from Split, Croatia